reINVENTION opERATION is a remix album by proGREX.iv, released on February 18, 1997, by Full Contact Records. proGREX.iv is a collaborative project between Mick Hale and vMarkus from Crocodile Shop with George Sarah of THC that features contributions from anGee, Sarah Folkman of Geko, Jared Hendrickson of Chemlab and Mitsy Larkin.

Music
The album partially consists of tracks from Consenting Guinea Pig by T.H.C. and The True Creator by D!v!s!on #9 that have been remixed by the band. An edited version of the track "reINVENTiNG SLEEP" (electroBODYmixx) titled "reInventing sLeep" (electroBodyedit) appeared on Awake the Machines - On the Line Vol. 2 by Out of Line and Sub/Mission Records.

Reception
The online magazine Sonic Boom had previously reviewed T.H.C.'s Consenting Guinea Pig and D!v!s!on #9's The True Creator, accusing the former for being "nothing altogether new or innovative" and the latter's "bland bass and percussion" of transforming the album into a "common collection of insipidly derivative material." Sonic Boom wrote a negative review for reINVENTION opERATION as well and said "in essence this eclectic collection of Drum'n'Bass, Trance, and other more experimental beat driven electronics, is no more than regurgitated music."

Track listing

Personnel 
Adapted from the reINVENTION opERATION liner notes.

proGREX.iv
 Mick Hale – instruments, production, vocals (5), sampler (6, 8, 10)
 George Sarah – instruments, production, mixing (3, 5, 6, 8, 10), remixer (6, 8, 10)
 vMarkus – instruments, production, vocals (2)

Additional performers
 anGEE – vocals (4)
 Sarah Folkman – vocals (3, 5)
 Jared Hendrickson – vocals (2, 11)
 Mitsy Larkin – vocals (1)

Production and design
 Dance Assembly Music Network (DAMn!) – design
 Alan Douches – mastering
 Zalman Fishman – executive-producer

Release history

References

External links 
 reINVENTION opERATION at Discogs (list of releases)

1997 debut albums
1997 remix albums
Full Contact Records remix albums